"White Horse" is a song written and performed by Tim Stahl and John Guldberg of the Danish duo Laid Back. It was released as the B-side of their single "Sunshine Reggae" which became a major hit in several European countries. In the US, the A-side was mainly ignored and it was the B-side that became most successful. It was released as a single and went on to spend three weeks at number one on the Dance Charts. The single also made the top five on the R&B singles chart and peaked at number 26 on the Billboard Hot 100. Although being played in European clubs, it failed to chart there when re-released as an A-side.

Lyrics
The song's lyrics, which refer to riding "the white horse" and "the white pony", have been interpreted as references to heroin and/or cocaine use. Rolling Stone described "White Horse" as "[p]erhaps the most unconvincing anti-drug song of all time". An article in Miami New Times listed it as one of the "top 10 cocaine songs" and stated, "It's often debated whether the white horse in this song refers to cocaine or heroin. Either way, Laid Back's 1982 single starts out persuading you not to ride the white horse but rather to ride the white pony, also a slang term for coke." The book Totally Awesome 80s described "White Horse" as "a song with very few words that still managed to be about the joys of cocaine". An article in the Tampa Bay Times stated, "While the title seems harmless, those in the know figured out the song was about drugs."

Co-writer Tim Stahl referred to an alternative interpretation of the song when interviewed for the book Flashbacks to Happiness: Eighties Music Revisited (published by iUniverse), saying, "Another cute anecdote about the song was when we got a letter from a little girl in Jutland in 1983, thanking us for making a song for her white pony!"

Charts

Weekly charts

Year-end charts

See also
List of number-one dance singles of 1984 (U.S.)

References

1983 singles
1983 songs
Laid Back songs
Electro songs
Post-disco songs
Songs about drugs
English-language Danish songs
Sire Records singles